Sainte-Christine is a parish municipality in Acton Regional County Municipality, in the province of Quebec, Canada. The population as of the Canada 2016 Census was 730.

Demographics 

Population trend:

(R) Revised count - Statistics Canada - February 10, 2009.

Mother tongue language (2006)

See also
List of parish municipalities in Quebec

References

External links

Regional County Municipality of Acton page for Sainte-Christine

Parish municipalities in Quebec
Incorporated places in Acton Regional County Municipality